Stephen John can refer to:

 Stephen John (cricketer) (born 1974), Pakistani cricketer
 Stephen John (footballer) (born 1966), English footballer
 John Stevenson (writer) (born 1930), British writer who wrote under the name Stephen John

See also
 Stephen Johns (disambiguation)